Kateryna is a Ukrainian form (transliteration) of Hellenic name Katherine.

It may refer to:

Kateryna Boloshkevich (1939–2018), Ukrainian weaver and statesperson
Kateryna Bondarenko (born 1986), professional female tennis player from Ukraine
Kateryna Grygorenko (born 1985), Ukrainian cross country skier who has competed since 2004
Kateryna Karsak (born 1985), female discus thrower from Ukraine
Kateryna Kozlova (born 1994), junior Ukrainian tennis player
Kateryna Lahno (born 1989), Ukrainian chess player
Kateryna Mikhalitsyna (born 1982), Ukrainian poet, children's writer, translator and editor
Kateryna Palekha (born 1980), athlete from Ukraine
Kateryna Pavlenko (born 1988), Ukrainian singer, lead singer of Go_A 
Kateryna Rohonyan (born 1984), female chess grandmaster
Kateryna Serdyuk (born 1983), Ukrainian archer
Kateryna Serebrianska (born 1977), former Individual Rhythmic Gymnast
Kateryna Stupnytska (1996–2022), sergeant of the Armed Forces of Ukraine
Kateryna Yurchenko (born 1976), Ukrainian sprint canoeist who competed in the mid 1990s
Kateryna Yushchenko (born 1961), former First Lady of Ukraine, second wife of former Ukrainian President Viktor Yushchenko
Kateryna Zubkova (born 1988), Ukrainian swimmer